The 1993–94 season was Aston Villa's 119th professional season; their 83rd season in the top-flight and their 6th consecutive Premier League season in the top flight of English football, the Premier League.

Aston Villa were never anywhere near the title race that they had looked likely to win for much of the previous season, as they finished 10th in the table a year after coming second, largely due to a shortage of goals. But their compensation for this shortcoming was victory in the League Cup final against Manchester United - a 3-1 scoreline ending the opposition's hope of becoming the first English team to win all three major domestic trophies in the same season. The likes of Dean Saunders and Paul McGrath were as consistent and reliable as ever, though a few older players such as Garry Parker, Kevin Richardson and Shaun Teale were starting to look past their best.

The pre-season signing of 30-year-old midfielder Andy Townsend from Chelsea was one of the best pieces of business done so far by manager Ron Atkinson, whereas the capture of Guy Whittingham from Portsmouth proved to be a disappointment - the striker never came anywhere near matching the tally of 47 goals he had scored done for the south coast club a season earlier, and he was loaned out to Wolverhampton to gain more first-team chances. Gordon Cowans rejoined the club for his third spell but left the club again after just a few months.

Villa fans were given something to look forward to with the emergence of promising young players like Ugo Ehiogu, Graham Fenton and Mark Bosnich.

Final league table

Results
Aston Villa's score comes first

Legend

FA Premier League

FA Cup

League Cup

UEFA Cup

Players

First-team squad
Squad at end of season

Left club during season

Reserve squad
The following players made most of their appearances this season for the reserves, and did not appear for the first-team, or only appeared for the first-team in friendlies.

Youth squad
The following players spent most of the season playing for the youth team, and did not appear for the first team, but may have appeared for the reserve team.

Schoolboys
The following players were signed to Aston Villa as associated schoolboys, and did not appear for the youth or reserve teams this season.

Trainees
The following players were signed to Aston Villa as trainees, and did not appear for the youth or reserve teams this season.

Notes

References

External links
Aston Villa official website
avfchistory.co.uk 1993–94 season

Aston Villa F.C. seasons
Aston Villa F.C.